The 2001 Race of Champions took place on December 7 to 9 at Gran Canaria. It was the 14th running of the event, and the 10th running at Gran Canaria. There was a slight format change for this year - The International Masters event was replaced by the Junior Masters event, open to rally drivers under the age of 30. Seeding for the main Race of Champions event was no longer awarded on the basis of having won a WRC title, but places were awarded for having posted the fastest times in the Nations Cup.

The vehicles used were the Peugeot 206 WRC, the Mitsubishi Lancer Evolution VI WRC, the SEAT Córdoba WRC, the Saab 93 Rallycross car and the ROC Buggy.

The individual competition was won by Harri Rovanpera, whilst the Nations Cup was won by Spain with Fernando Alonso, Jesús Puras and Rubén Xaus.

Participants

Race of Champions

Nations' Cup

Legends Race

Antonio Zanini was a late substitute for Hannu Mikkola.

Group A

Group B

Junior Rally Masters

Race of Champions
Heat A

Heat B

Nations Cup
Group A

Group B

References

External links
 https://web.archive.org/web/20020926050008/http://www.carreradecampeones.org/

2001
2001 in French motorsport
2001 in Spanish motorsport
International sports competitions hosted by Spain
2001,Race of Champions